Ayer Baloi is a mukim in Pontian District, Johor, Malaysia.

Geography
The mukim spans over an area of 142 km2.

See also
 Geography of Malaysia

References

Mukims of Pontian District